The 2016 NCAA Division I Women's Golf Championship was contested May 20–25 at Eugene Country Club in Eugene, Oregon. It was the 35th annual tournament to establish the national champions of the 2016 season in NCAA Division I women's collegiate golf. The tournament was hosted by the University of Oregon. There were both team and individual championships.

This was the second time, following the previous year, that the men's and women's Division I golf tournaments were played at the same location; the 2016 NCAA Division I Men's Golf Championship was held in Eugene after the women's championship from May 27 to June 1.

Regional qualifying tournaments
There were four regional sites that held the qualifying tournaments across the United States from May 5–7, 2016.
The six lowest scoring teams from each of the regional sites qualified to compete at the national championships as team and individual players.
An additional three individuals with the lowest score in their regional, whose teams did not qualify, qualified to compete for the individual title in the national championship.

^ Teams listed in qualifying order.

Venue
This was the second time the NCAA Division I Women's Golf Championship was held at Eugene Country Club, and the second time the tournament has been hosted by the University of Oregon.

Format
Similar to 2015 NCAA Division I Women's Golf Championship, all teams competed for three days (54 holes) on a  stroke-play basis from Friday until Sunday. On Monday, the lowest scoring player was awarded as the national champion for the individual title at the conclusion of the 72 holes stroke-play event. At the same time, the lowest scoring eight teams advanced to the match-play team event. The quarterfinals and semifinals of match-play event were played on Tuesday and the finals were played on Wednesday.

Team competition

Leaderboard 
(Par: 288, Total: 1152)

Remaining teams: Tennessee (885), Florida (886), Michigan (887), Georgia (887), Furman (888), Miami (890), Ohio State (892), Texas (897), Brigham Young (898).

15 out of 24 teams proceeded to the final round after finishing 54 holes.

Match-play bracket
8 of 15 teams with the lowest stroke play total will advance into the match-play event.

Sources:

Individual competition
(Par:72, Total: 288)

The remaining 84 players from the top 15 teams and the top 9 individuals outside of those teams competed for the individual championship title after the 54-hole cut.

References 

NCAA Women's Golf Championship
Golf in Oregon
NCAA Division I Women's Golf Championship
NCAA Division I Women's Golf Championship
NCAA Division I Women's Golf Championship
NCAA Division I Women's Golf Championship
Wikipedia Student Program